Mikhail Iosifovich Veller (also sometimes Weller;) (born May 20, 1948) is a Russian writer of Ukrainian Jewish extraction. He holds a dual citizenship of Russia and Estonia.

Biography
Veller was born in Kamianets-Podilskyi, Ukrainian SSR, Soviet Union (modern day Ukraine)  in 1948. In 1972 he graduated with a degree in linguistics from Leningrad University. He worked as a children's summer camp counselor, a hunter in Taimyr, a shepherd in the Altai mountains, a logger, a journalist, a teacher, and more - around 30 professions in all.

Veller's first book, a collection of short stories titled I Want To Be A Yard-Sweeper, was published in Estonia in 1983, followed by Heart Breaker (1988), Technology of a Short Story (1989), and Rendezvous with a Celebrity (1990). A Novel of Upbringing and Adventures of Major Zvyagin (1991) became bestsellers, along with "The Legends of Nevsky Prospect" (1993). His book Everything about Life is a book about how the world works, why a no one ever has what they need, and why happiness is not achievable but should be sought (his later book Cassandra updates this philosophy). His mini-novel The Knife of Seryozha Dovlatov created a literary scandal. Hist latest bestseller, Courier from Pisa (2000), has had 11 editions.

In Everything about Life Veller repeated Ernest Hemingway's words: "There are people who want to know everything and those who are sick of what they already know. The latter say nothing to prevent things from turning for the worse, while the former interfere in all, hoping to make things better" (paraphrased). Veller proclaims himself to be with the former kind.

Veller nurtures his world-view to the point that he publishes volumes with philosophical inclination. He invented energoevolutionism. According to this theory the primordial energy released in the Big Bang is attached to material structures of ever increasing complexity, which in their turn decompose and release energy. These cycles continue at ever increasing speed. The human existence is entangled in this process and also increases the speed of revolution. Humankind thus is at the cutting edge of the evolution of the universe. The end of history is to arrive when post-humanity will assist the release of all energy in the matter, thereby causing a new cycle by the next BIg Bang event. Within the concept of energoevolution Veller addresses also aesthetics, sociology and psychology. Veller's philosophical essays achieved some attention in Russia and abroad, but also met with severe criticism from professional philosophers.

Veller has lectured on modern Russian prose in the universities of Milan, Jerusalem and Copenhagen.

In his free time, Veller lives in Moscow but continues to work in Tallinn. His hobbies include target shooting.

English translations
 The Guru

References
 Veller's biography

Notes

1948 births
Living people
People from Kamianets-Podilskyi
Russian male novelists
Russian philosophers
Russian Jews
Jewish Russian writers
Russians in Estonia
Recipients of the Order of the White Star, 4th Class